Eberhard of Béthune (also known as Everard of Béthune, Évrard de Béthune, Éverard de Béthune, Ebrardus Bethuniensis or Bithuniensis, Eberhardus Bethuniensis, Eberard, Ebrard, Ebrad; d. c. 1212) was a Flemish grammarian of the early thirteenth century, from Arras. He was the author of Graecismus, a popular Latin grammatical poem, dated to c. 1212. The name came from a short section on the Greek language. His Laborintus is "an elaborate and critical treatise on poetry and pedagogics"; it is also known as De Miseriis Rectorum Scholarum.

He was also actively engaged against the Waldensians, and wrote a book Liber Antihaeresis (c 1210) against them. He is cited in Foxe's Book of Martyrs as to the etymology of the name.

References

Further reading
Anne Grondeux (2001), Le Graecismus d'Évrard de Béthune à travers ses gloses
Anne Grondeux (2010), Glosa super Graecismum Eberhardi Bethuniensis Capitula I–III: de figuris coloribusque rhetoricis 

Flemish writers (before 1830)
Linguists from France
Medieval linguists
Persecution of the Waldensians
13th-century Latin writers